Nidamanur or Nidamanuru or Nidamanoor may refer to places in India:
 Nidamanur mandal, a mandal in Nalgonda district, Andhra Pradesh
 Nidamanur, Prakasam, a village in Andhra Pradesh 
 Nidamanur, Vijayawada, in NTR district, Andhra Pradesh